Fawaz Al-Sqoor (born April 23, 1996), is a Saudi Arabian professional footballer who plays as a right-sided midfielder or wing-back for Saudi Pro League club Al-Shabab.

Club career
On July 5, 2018, Fawaz Al-Sqoor left his boyhood club, Najran, to join Al-Wehda. On October 21, 2020, Fawaz Al-Sqoor left Al-Wehda, to join Al-Shabab.

References

External links 
 

Living people
1996 births
People from Najran
Saudi Arabian footballers
Najran SC players
Al-Wehda Club (Mecca) players
Al-Shabab FC (Riyadh) players
Saudi Professional League players
Saudi First Division League players
Association football midfielders
Association football fullbacks